Gordon Stewart Anderson (1958 – July 8, 1991) was a Canadian writer, whose novel The Toronto You Are Leaving was published by his mother 15 years after his death.

Anderson was born in Hamilton, Ontario, raised in Sault Ste. Marie and lived for many years in Toronto.  He graduated from the University of Waterloo and the University of Western Ontario.  A gay man, Anderson died of AIDS-related causes. He is remembered on the Canadian AIDS Memorial Quilt.

A number of years after his death, his mother Marlene Lloyd discovered that a small publishing house had an unpublished manuscript for The Toronto You Are Leaving, a novel Anderson had written about life in Toronto's gay community in the late 1970s. She submitted the manuscript to several other publishers without success, and eventually edited and self-published the novel herself in 2006. The novel garnered a strong review in The Globe and Mail, as well as significant attention in Canada's gay press.

Marlene Lloyd had also previously published a book of her own, Not a Total Waste: The True Story of a Mother, Her Son and AIDS, about Anderson's death. She subsequently pitched a screenplay adaptation of Anderson's novel, although the film was never produced.

See also
 List of University of Waterloo people

Notes and references

External links
  Untroubled Heart, publisher of The Toronto You Are Leaving 

1958 births
1991 deaths
Canadian male novelists
Canadian people of Scottish descent
Canadian gay writers
People from Sault Ste. Marie, Ontario
Writers from Hamilton, Ontario
Writers from Toronto
AIDS-related deaths in Canada
Canadian LGBT novelists
University of Waterloo alumni
University of Western Ontario alumni
20th-century Canadian male writers
20th-century Canadian novelists
20th-century Canadian LGBT people
Gay novelists